Half Peak is the highest summit of the east central San Juan Mountains in the Rocky Mountains of North America.

Location 

See also

List of Colorado mountain ranges
List of Colorado mountain summits
List of Colorado fourteeners
List of Colorado 4000 meter prominent summits
List of the most prominent summits of Colorado
List of Colorado county high points

References

External links

Mountains of Hinsdale County, Colorado
Gunnison National Forest
San Juan Mountains (Colorado)
North American 4000 m summits
Mountains of Colorado